The 1921 Georgia Tech Golden Tornado baseball team represented the Georgia Tech Golden Tornado of the Georgia Institute of Technology in the 1921 NCAA baseball season, winning the SIAA championship. Red Barron was on the team.

Schedule and results

References

Georgia Tech Golden Tornado
Georgia Tech Yellow Jackets baseball seasons
Southern Intercollegiate Athletic Association baseball champion seasons
Georgia Tech
1920s in Atlanta